It's a Wonderful Life is a 1946 Frank Capra film starring James Stewart.

It's a Wonderful Life may also refer to:

In film and television:
It's a Wonderful Life (1994 film), a Hong Kong film starring Leslie Cheung
It's a Wonderful Life (2007 film), a Hong Kong film directed by Ronald Cheng
Franz Kafka's It's a Wonderful Life, a 1995 short film
"It's a Wonderful Life", an episode of That '70s Show
It's a Wonderful Life (TV series), 2013 Singaporean Chinese-language TV series

In other media:
It's a Wonderful Life (opera), Heggie
It's a Wonderful Life (album), an album by Sparklehorse
It's a Wonderful Life (EP), an EP by Fishbone
Tomoyo After: It's a Wonderful Life, a Japanese visual novel
It's a Wonderful Life: A Live Radio Play, a stage play adapted by Joe Landry based on the 1946 film

See also
 It Was a Wonderful Life, a 1993 documentary film
 It's a Wonderful Afterlife, an Indian/British film
 A Wonderful Life (disambiguation)
 Wonderful Life (disambiguation)
 It's a Wonderful Lie (disambiguation)